Hamstall Ridware is a village and civil parish in the Lichfield district of Staffordshire, England. It is in the Trent Valley, and lies close to the villages of Hill Ridware, Mavesyn Ridware and Pipe Ridware. It is eight miles north of the city of Lichfield, and four miles east of Rugeley.

Within the village lie the grade II* listed ruins of Hamstall Hall.

See also
Listed buildings in Hamstall Ridware

References

External links

Ridware Historical Society

Villages in Staffordshire
Civil parishes in Staffordshire